Tajabad (also Romanized as Tājābād; also known as Kafā’īyeh (Persian: كفائيه) and Tājābād-e Now) is a village in Azadegan Rural District, in the Central District of Rafsanjan County, Kerman Province, Iran. At the 2006 census, its population was 115, in 32 families.

References 

Populated places in Rafsanjan County